Zygosepalum is a genus of flowering plants from the orchid family, Orchidaceae.

Species
Species accepted by the Plants of the World Online as of 2022: 

Zygosepalum angustilabium 
Zygosepalum ballii 
Zygosepalum kegelii 
Zygosepalum labiosum 
Zygosepalum lindeniae 
Zygosepalum marginatum 
Zygosepalum revolutum 
Zygosepalum tatei

See also
 List of Orchidaceae genera

References

 Pridgeon, A.M., Cribb, P.J., Chase, M.A. & Rasmussen, F. eds. (1999). Genera Orchidacearum 1. Oxford Univ. Press.
 Pridgeon, A.M., Cribb, P.J., Chase, M.A. & Rasmussen, F. eds. (2001). Genera Orchidacearum 2. Oxford Univ. Press.
 Pridgeon, A.M., Cribb, P.J., Chase, M.A. & Rasmussen, F. eds. (2003). Genera Orchidacearum 3. Oxford Univ. Press
 Berg Pana, H. 2005. Handbuch der Orchideen-Namen. Dictionary of Orchid Names. Dizionario dei nomi delle orchidee. Ulmer, Stuttgart

External links

Cymbidieae genera
Zygopetalinae